Rabbit-skin glue is a sizing that also acts as an adhesive. It is essentially refined rabbit collagen, and was originally used as an ingredient in traditional gesso.

History
In traditional oil painting as practiced by the Renaissance painter, skin glue was used to seal the canvas. This is necessary because the linseed oil that forms the base of most oil paint contains linolenic acid that will destroy the canvas fibers over time. Renaissance artists also knew that pure size (hide glue) became brittle once dry, and would mix it with oil and chalk to make a "half-ground" for canvases. Pure hide glue was usually applied only to rigid supports like panels. Though this does help to seal the canvas or panel, artists still applied a layer of "oil ground", which was often lead based paint, in order to provide a binding layer for the final oil paint to adhere to.

Production
Rabbit skin glue is an animal glue created by prolonged boiling of animal connective tissue. Rabbit skin glue can be bought in powder form or in larger chunks. Preparation involves using the correct proportion of water to glue to achieve the correct consistency and strength. It should be heated to just short of the boiling point. Too much heat results in a product with reduced adhesive qualities.

Uses

Adhesive
As an adhesive, rabbit-skin glue is used in the production of the bellows of concertinas, and in other smaller, light instruments—prominently in violins.  Its supreme advantages are very fast bonding and easy debonding with hot water, if an instrument must be disassembled for internal repairs.  It also has very low creep, which is the tendency of some glues to plastically yield under even low but consistent stresses over time. For example, guitar bridges are subject to high lateral stresses that with the wrong glue can lead it to creep forward.

The proteins of the glue soak into the wood and interlace with its pores. Setting of the glue occurs with cooling and drying, so the working time is very short, on the order of minutes, to stick the parts together and get full strength, unlike PVA glue which might provide 20–30 minutes.
Furthermore, since the glue only works by microscopically stitching the wood fibers together, any gaps in the joint are not going to be successfully filled, and so the mating surface must be very smooth.

Sizing
When used in painting as a sizing, it is spread thoroughly over a canvas that has been placed on the stretcher. When the glue dries, it tightens the canvas. After this has been allowed to dry, an oil-based primer is then applied. A canvas sized with rabbit-skin glue can be made tighter than with other alternatives—such as an acrylic-based gesso—because of the shrinkage. This type of canvas is also valuable because it can be sanded to a flatter texture, which allows the painter to achieve a finer level of detail than can be achieved with a typical acrylic gesso ground.

This rabbit-skin glue ground is only appropriate for use under oil paint. Acrylic-based media will flake off a canvas prepared with rabbit-skin glue and are therefore not appropriate.

Rabbit skin glue is considered to be a major cause of cracking in oil paintings by most modern conservators.  Because the glue is hygroscopic, it continually absorbs moisture from the atmosphere, causing the glue to swell and shrink as ambient humidity levels change.  Over many humidity cycles, this repeated flexing causes the brittle oil paint to crack.  Modern substitutes for rabbit skin glue are available, such as Gamblin's PVA size  and Golden Acrylics’ GAC100. These substitutes do not have the hygroscopic properties of rabbit skin glue, while still being very slightly hygroscopic, and should not cause the damage to oil paints that rabbit skin glue does.  However, these modern replacements do not stiffen and tighten the canvas as well as rabbit skin glue does, so some artists still prefer to use rabbit skin glue.

See also

 Sizing

References
 

Painting materials
Adhesives
Gilding

de:Hasenleim